The 2003 North Norfolk District Council election took place on 1 May 1999 to elect members of North Norfolk District Council in England. This was on the same day as other local elections. The whole council was up for election on new ward boundaries and the number of seats increased by 3.

Election result

|}

References

2003 English local elections
May 2003 events in the United Kingdom
2003
2000s in Norfolk